Jakarta International Literary Festival or JILF is an annual literary festival held at Jakarta in Indonesia. The goal of the festival is to promote Indonesian literature in international literary platforms. The Jakarta Arts Council is an  organization founded by Indonesian artists, which had been officially stated by then Governor of Jakarta, Ali Sadikin, on June 17, 1969.

Authors from Asia and Africa are to participate in the festival.

References

Events in Jakarta
Literary festivals in Indonesia
Annual events in Indonesia
Tourist attractions in Jakarta
Festivals established in 2019